The 1966 World Ninepin Bowling Classic Championships was the sixth edition of the championships and was held in Bucharest, Romania, from 19 to 25 June 1966.

In the men's competition the title was won by Romania in the team competition, Petre Purge and Constantin Rădulescu (Romania) in the pair competition and by Horst Bräutigam (East Germany) in the individual event. In the women's competition the title was won by Romania in the team competition, Marie Mikulčíková and Vlasta Šindlerová (Czechoslovakia) in the pair competition and by Vlasta  Šindlerová (Czechoslovakia) in the individual event.

Participating teams

Men

Women

Results

Men - team 
The competition was played with 200 throws mixed (100 all, 100 clean). Teams were composed of 6 competitors and the scores were added up.

|}

Women - team 
The competition was played with 100 throws mixed (50 all, 50 clean). Teams were composed of 6 competitors and the scores were added up.

|}

Men - pair 

|}

Women - pair 

|}

Men - individual 

|}

Women - individual 

|}

Medal summary

Medal table

Men

Women

References 
 WC Archive on KZS
 WC History on WNBA NBC

World Ninepin Bowling Classic Championships
1966 in bowling
1966 in Romanian sport
International sports competitions hosted by Romania
Sports competitions in Bucharest